Vladan Adžić (born 5 July 1987) is a Montenegrin footballer who currently plays for Budućnost Podgorica.

Club career
Born in Cetinje, Adžić made his senior debut with FK Bokelj in the 2005–06 Second League of Serbia and Montenegro. During the winter break he moved to FK Lovćen where he played until summer 2008 afterwards joining FK Rudar Pljevlja.  With Rudar, he played for 4 consecutive seasons in the Montenegrin First League, becoming a champion in 2009–10 and runner-up in 2009–10.  He also won the Montenegrin Cup on both those seasons, 2009 and 2010, beside being runner-up in 2012.

OFK Beograd
In August 2012 he moved abroad to Serbia by joining OFK Beograd.  He made his debut in the 2012–13 Serbian SuperLiga on 19 August 2012, in a second round match against FK Jagodina. On 25 January 2013, during the half-time of a friendly match with his former club Rudar, he took a bottle of transparent-liquid thinking it was water, and subsequently threw up when his body reacted to alcoholic rakia.

International career
Vladan Adžić has received a call for the Montenegrin national team on several occasions. He made his debut on 7 October 2020 in a friendly against Latvia.

Honours
Rudar Pljevlja
Montenegrin First League: 2009–10
Montenegrin Cup: 2010, 2011

References

External links
 Vladan Adžić at UEFA.com
 
 

1987 births
Living people
Sportspeople from Cetinje
Association football central defenders
Montenegrin footballers
Montenegro international footballers
FK Bokelj players
FK Lovćen players
FK Rudar Pljevlja players
OFK Beograd players
Suwon FC players
FK Budućnost Podgorica players
Pohang Steelers players
NK Varaždin players
Second League of Serbia and Montenegro players
Montenegrin First League players
Serbian SuperLiga players
K League 1 players
K League 2 players
Croatian Football League players
Montenegrin expatriate footballers
Expatriate footballers in Serbia
Montenegrin expatriate sportspeople in Serbia
Expatriate footballers in South Korea
Montenegrin expatriate sportspeople in South Korea
Expatriate footballers in Croatia
Montenegrin expatriate sportspeople in Croatia